Maksutov is a Russian masculine surname, its feminine counterpart is Maksutova. It may refer to

 Dmitri Dmitrievich Maksutov (1896–1964), Russian optician and astronomer
 Dmitri Petrovich Maksutov (1832–1889), Imperial Russian Navy rear-admiral and last Governor of Russian America 
 Pavel Maksutov (1825–1882), Imperial Russian Navy rear-admiral, prince, hero of Crimean War and 15th governor of Taganrog

Russian-language surnames